The Steed is a 2019 Mongolian drama film directed by Erdenebileg Ganbold. It was selected as the Mongolian entry for the Best International Feature Film at the 92nd Academy Awards, but it was not nominated. It won the Best Feature Film award at the 2019 San Diego International Film Festival.

Plot
As the Russian Revolution spills into Mongolia, a boy seeks to be reunited with his horse.

Cast
 Erdenebileg Ganbold as Erdene
 Ariunbold E. as Chuluun (Boy)	
 Enkhtuul G. as Mother
 Tserendagva Purevdorj as Morin Khuur Craftsman
 Mendbayar Dagvadorj as Morin Khuur Craftsman's Wife
 Vasiliy Mishchenko as Russian Farmer
 Aidos Bektemir as Kazakh Herdsman
 Nurlan Alimzhanov as Kazakh Herdsman's Son
 Tserenbold Tsegmid as Chief Gongor (as Tsegmed Tserenbold)
 Yalalt Namsrai as Baarai
 Todgerel Erdenetuya as Badarchin
 Altangerel G. as Horseman
 Purevdorj J. as Shaman
 Aleksandr Kalashnik as Russian Fugitive
 Oleg Naumov as Russian Soldier
 Akniet Belasar as Kazakh Daughter-in-Law (as Akniet Belarsarova)
 Erkhemjargal J. as Tsakhar
 Khuubaatar U. as Khuder
 Enkhsaikhan U. as Mongolian Lord

See also
 List of submissions to the 92nd Academy Awards for Best International Feature Film
 List of Mongolian submissions for the Academy Award for Best International Feature Film

Accolades 
The Steed won the Golden Eagle for Best Feature Film at the 2019 San Diego International Film Festival and the Spirit of Cinema Award at the Oldenburg International Film Festival.

References

External links
 

2019 films
2019 drama films
Mongolian-language films
Films about horses
Mongolian drama films